Wells Fargo Tower, Fort Worth is a building located in Fort Worth, Texas. At , it is Fort Worth's fifth tallest building. It has 33 floors. It is surrounded by Commerce Street, East 1st Street, East 2nd Street, and Main Street. It was completed in 1982. It was the tallest building in Fort Worth from 1982 until 1983 when the Burnett Plaza was completed. Wells Fargo Tower is the shorter of the two towers in the City Center Towers Complex. The structures resemble pinwheels but are not true twins.

See also
List of tallest buildings in Fort Worth

References
Wells Fargo Tower, Fort Worth at Emporis.com

Specific

Skyscraper office buildings in Fort Worth, Texas
Wells Fargo buildings
1982 establishments in Texas
Office buildings completed in 1982